Migrant Schools are a type of schools for migrant students in China. The teachers and managers of these schools usually come from countryside, just as the migrant students in these schools.
In China, if a student want to be accepted by a primary school or secondary school, he/she must have a local household registration record ("Hukou"). However, for those migrant workers (Mingong), they and their children usually don't have local household registration record. That means their children will not be accepted by schools in the city they work in. Thus they have to send their children to "Migrant Schools" run privately.

These "Migrant Schools" are usually low-cost. Nevertheless, these schools have many problems: Most teachers in these schools are poor-educated; The classrooms are usually crowded; Many Migrant Schools don't hold a permission issued by the authorities. A research suggested that the education quality of these schools are far below the average.

Situation in Shanghai

According to official estimates, there are about 9 million migrant workers in Shanghai. The children of these migrant workers move with their parents to urban centers like Shanghai to live there temporarily. About 35,000 rural migrant workers' children of school age live in Shanghai, according to government statistics. Approximately 30% of these migrant children cannot be enrolled in public schools. This is due to, among other things, problems with residence registration and low educational standards. Many of these children attend one of the more than 80 schools managed and funded by the government for migrant children in Shanghai. These schools were founded by migrants themselves. Then they were gradually taken over by the local education authority. Initially, these schools were illegally housed in substandard, overcrowded buildings with poor facilities and were often relocated or closed. The situation in Shanghai has improved. However, the quality of education in migrant schools continues to lag behind that of public schools.

See also 
Mingong

References 

Education in China
Migrant workers